Players and pairs who neither have high enough rankings nor receive wild cards may participate in a qualifying tournament held one week before the annual Wimbledon Tennis Championships.

Seeds

  Lionel Barthez /  Patrick Baur (second round)
  Jeff Belloli /  Mahesh Bhupathi (first round)
  Jamie Morgan /  Michael Tebbutt (second round)
  Scott Draper /  Peter Tramacchi (qualified)
  Juan Carlos Bianchi /  Roberto Saad (second round)
  James Greenhalgh /  Chris Haggard (first round)

Qualifiers

  Scott Draper /  Peter Tramacchi
  Jamie Delgado /  Gary Henderson
  Doug Flach /  Michael Joyce

Lucky losers
  Grant Doyle /  Todd Larkham

Qualifying draw

First qualifier

Second qualifier

Third qualifier

External links

1995 Wimbledon Championships – Men's draws and results at the International Tennis Federation

Men's Doubles Qualifying
Wimbledon Championship by year – Men's doubles qualifying